Latter Rain Movement may refer to:

"Latter Rain" is a term used in Holiness and Pentecostal movements.
Latter Rain (1880s movement) was a precursor to modern Pentecostalism.
Latter Rain (post–World War II movement) originated within Pentecostalism during the late 1940s.